Dictyosphaerium is a genus of green algae, in the family Chlorellaceae.

References

External links

Trebouxiophyceae genera
Chlorellaceae